Birahim Gaye (born 27 February 1994), is a Senegalese footballer who plays for Hassania Agadir as a forward.

References

External links
 

1994 births
Living people
Senegalese footballers
Senegalese expatriate footballers
Association football forwards
Diambars FC players
Al-Shabab SC (Kuwait) players
Al-Shahania SC players
Hassania Agadir players
Senegal Premier League players
Kuwait Premier League players
Qatari Second Division players
Botola players
Expatriate footballers in Kuwait
Expatriate footballers in Qatar
Expatriate footballers in Morocco
Senegalese expatriate sportspeople in Kuwait
Senegalese expatriate sportspeople in Qatar
Senegalese expatriate sportspeople in Morocco
Senegal international footballers